This page lists notable alumni and former students, faculty, and administrators of Wabash College.

Alumni

Academia
George J. Graham, Jr., political theorist
John S. Hougham, natural scientist and President, Purdue University, 1876
William Parker McKee, President, Shimer College
Stephen G. Miller, archaeologist
Tom Ostrom, social psychologist
Stephen H. Webb, theologian and philosopher of religion

Business
Robert Allen, former AT&T CEO
David Broecker (born 1961), CEO of Alkermes and Indiana Biosciences Research Institute
James A Davlin V, former Treasurer and Vice-President  General Motors
James Bert Garner, Head of the Chemistry Department, 1901–14; inventor of the gas mask used in World War I
Brad Gerstner, Founder of Altimeter Capital

Law
Edward Daniels, co-founder of Baker & Daniels (now Faegre Drinker Biddle & Reath)
David E. Kendall, President Bill Clinton's attorney, known for a number of anti-death penalty cases

Media and the arts
Eric Daman, Emmy-winning costumer and fashion designer
Dean Jagger, Oscar-winning motion picture actor
Andrea James, LGBT rights activist and film producer
Silky Nutmeg Ganache, drag queen and competitor on RuPaul's Drag Race (season 11) and All stars 6

Kenyon Nicholson, Broadway playwright, screenwriter
Byron Price, winner of a Pulitzer Prize in Journalism (1944), Director of the Office of Censorship
Frank Reynolds, ABC World News Tonight anchor
Lawrence Sanders, novelist
Allen Saunders, cartoonist
Dan Simmons, science-fiction author, dedicated his novel Ilium to the college
Sheldon Vanauken, author, confidante of C. S. Lewis

Medicine
Robert G. Roeder, Arnold and Mabel Beckman Professor, Head of the Laboratory of Biochemical and Molecular Biology at The Rockefeller University
Emery Andrew Rovenstine, co-founder of the American Society of Anesthesiologists

Military
Major General Edward Canby, only United States general killed during the Indian Wars
Major General Oscar R. Cauldwell, Marine Corps officer during World War II
Brigadier General John Coburn, Civil War officer; accepted the surrender of Atlanta
General Charles Cruft, Civil War officer
Brigadier General Speed S. Fry, Civil War officer
Major General Lew Wallace, Civil War officer, statesman, and author of Ben-Hur
 Rear Admiral Alex Miller, Former Chief of Staff at the National Security Agency
 Lt. Gen. Charles D. Herron United States Army
 Officer 8th Air Force, William Brummett, Army Air Force Pilot, World War II

Politics

John C. Black, US Representative and Medal of Honor recipient
Jeremy Bird, National Field Organizer for Barack Obama's 2012 Campaign
Mike Braun, United States Senator; former Indiana State Representative, District 63
Kevin P. Chavous, Council of the District of Columbia Representative
John Coburn, United States Representative from Indiana, Civil War Brigadier General
Hiram Orlando Fairchild, speaker of the Wisconsin State Assembly
Cleon H. Foust, Indiana Attorney General
Stephen Goldsmith, Mayor of Indianapolis, Deputy Mayor of New York City
Dwight Green, Governor of Illinois and Capone prosecutor
Andrew Hamilton, United States Representative
Bayless W. Hanna, Indiana Attorney General, United States Ambassador to Iran and United States Ambassador to Argentina 
Will Hays, postmaster general and film censor czar
Randall Head, Indiana State Senator, District 18
William A. Ketcham, Indiana Attorney General, Commander-in-Chief of the Grand Army of the Republic
Thomas Riley Marshall, twenty-eighth Vice-President of the United States (under Woodrow Wilson)
Joseph E. McDonald, United States Representative and Senator
Reginald Meeks, Kentucky State Representative
Luke Messer, United States Representative
Thomas MacDonald Patterson, United States Representative and Senator
William Pittenger, United States Representative
John Pope, Chicago alderman (10th ward)
Todd Rokita, United States Representative, 44th Attorney General of Indiana
Richard J. Stephenson, financier of conservative causes
Reginald H. Sullivan, Mayor of Indianapolis
Brent Waltz, Indiana State Senator, District 36
Charles P. White, Indiana Secretary of State
Raymond E. Willis, United States Senator
Henry Lane Wilson, United States Ambassador to Mexico
James Wilson, United States Representative from Indiana
John L. Wilson, United States Representative and Senator
William Allen Woods, federal judge and Justice of the Indiana Supreme Court

Science
Robert Dirks, computational chemist
 Watson McMillan “Mac” Laetsch, plant biologist

Sports
Knute Cauldwell, NFL player
Ward Lambert, college basketball coach
Don Leppert, Major League Baseball player, homered in first at-bat, first position player All-Star in Washington-Texas franchise history
Ward Meese, National Football League player
Pete Metzelaars, National Football League all-time leader in games played by a tight end and four-time AFC champion
Century Milstead, college football Hall of Famer
William H. Spaulding, football head coach, University of Minnesota and UCLA
Ed Summers, Major League Baseball player, pitched in Games 1 and 4 of 1908 World Series

Faculty
 Garfield V. Cox was appointed to start the college's Department of Public Speaking in 1917.
 Poet and critic Ezra Pound (1885–1972) was appointed chair of the Department of Romance Languages for the 1907–1908 academic year, but left in February after alleged sexual impropriety.
 William Placher 1948–2008 was an American postliberal theologian. He was LaFollette Distinguished Professor in the Humanities at Wabash College until his death in 2008

References

Wabash College people
Wabash College